Minister's Face Nature Preserve is a nature preserve on Long Island in New Brunswick's Kennebecasis River northwest of the town of Rothesay.

Minister's Face is home to several endangered species of plants, as well as a nesting site for peregrine falcons.

References
The Nature Trust of New Brunswick

Geography of New Brunswick
Geography of Kings County, New Brunswick